Scott Eric Tucker (born February 18, 1976) is an American former competition swimmer, Olympic gold medalist, and former world record-holder.  Tucker represented the United States at two consecutive Summer Olympics.  He won a gold (1996) and a silver medal (2000) with the U.S. relay teams in the preliminary heats of the men's 4×100-meter freestyle.

See also
 List of Auburn University people
 List of Olympic medalists in swimming (men)
 List of World Aquatics Championships medalists in swimming (men)
 World record progression 4 × 200 metres freestyle relay

References
 

 

1976 births
Living people
American male freestyle swimmers
Auburn Tigers men's swimmers
World record setters in swimming
Medalists at the FINA World Swimming Championships (25 m)
Olympic gold medalists for the United States in swimming
Olympic silver medalists for the United States in swimming
Seminole High School (Pinellas County, Florida) alumni
Sportspeople from Birmingham, Alabama
Swimmers at the 1996 Summer Olympics
Swimmers at the 1999 Pan American Games
Swimmers at the 2000 Summer Olympics
World Aquatics Championships medalists in swimming
Medalists at the 2000 Summer Olympics
Medalists at the 1996 Summer Olympics
Pan American Games gold medalists for the United States
Pan American Games medalists in swimming
Goodwill Games medalists in swimming
Universiade medalists in swimming
Universiade gold medalists for the United States
Competitors at the 2001 Goodwill Games
Medalists at the 1999 Pan American Games